Authon ( or ) is a commune in the Loir-et-Cher department in the region of Centre-Val de Loire, France, next to Vendôme.

Population

Economy
Economic activities are mainly agricultural, with some services including tourism (there are three castles, nature trails and a popular restaurant). A couple of streams run through the village's territory, including one facetiously named the Danube.

Personalities
The village has supplied a resistance hero, François de Brantes, and, in his daughter Anne-Aymone, a wife to former president Valéry Giscard d'Estaing (d.2020). The latter is buried in Authon alongside his daughter Jacinte.

See also
Communes of the Loir-et-Cher department

References

External links
Official site

Communes of Loir-et-Cher